Mihai Donisan (born 24 July 1988) is a Romanian athlete specialising in the high jump. He won two medals at the Jeux de la Francophonie, gold in 2009 and silver in 2013.

He has personal bests of 2.31 metres outdoors (2013) and 2.30 metres indoors (2013). On 13 May 2016, he was banned for the use of an illegal substance meldonium and was banned for two years until 19 February 2018.

Competition record

References

1988 births
Living people
Romanian male high jumpers
World Athletics Championships athletes for Romania
Doping cases in athletics
Romanian sportspeople in doping cases
European Games competitors for Romania
Athletes (track and field) at the 2019 European Games
20th-century Romanian people
21st-century Romanian people